Unknown Soldier, in comics, may refer to:

Unknown Soldier (DC Comics), a DC Comics character
Unknown Soldier (Ace Comics), an Ace Comics character

See also
Unknown Soldier (disambiguation)